Nicole Jagerman (born 23 July 1967) is a former tennis player from the Netherlands.

Jagerman represented her native country at the 1992 Summer Olympics in Barcelona, Spain. As a pro, she reached her career-high singles on 14 May 1990 when she became world No. 43.

WTA career finals

Doubles: 5 (2 titles, 3 runner-ups)

ITF finals

Singles (0–3)

Doubles (4–2)

External links
 
 
 

1967 births
Living people
Dutch female tennis players
Olympic tennis players of the Netherlands
Sportspeople from Amstelveen
Tennis players at the 1992 Summer Olympics
20th-century Dutch women
21st-century Dutch women